The 1999 edition of The Winston was the second exhibition stock car race of the 1999 NASCAR Winston Cup Series and the 15th iteration of the event. The race was held on Saturday, May 22, 1999, before an audience of 120,000 in Concord, North Carolina at Lowe's Motor Speedway, a 1.5 miles (2.4 km) permanent quad-oval. The race took the scheduled 90 laps to complete. At race's end, Hendrick Motorsports driver Terry Labonte would make a late-race gamble on a pitstop, taking four tires. With five laps to go, he would charge to the front and defend the field, securing his second straight and consecutive The Winston victory. To fill out the top three, Joe Gibbs Racing driver Tony Stewart and Hendrick Motorsports driver Jeff Gordon would finish second and third, respectively.

In the preliminary Winston Open race, Tony Stewart was able to dominate the majority of the race to earn a spot in The Winston.

Background 

Lowe's Motor Speedway is a motorsports complex located in Concord, North Carolina, United States 13 miles from Charlotte, North Carolina. The complex features a 1.5 miles (2.4 km) quad oval track that hosts NASCAR racing including the prestigious Coca-Cola 600 on Memorial Day weekend and the NEXTEL All-Star Challenge, as well as the UAW-GM Quality 500. The speedway was built in 1959 by Bruton Smith and is considered the home track for NASCAR with many race teams located in the Charlotte area. The track is owned and operated by Speedway Motorsports Inc. (SMI) with Marcus G. Smith (son of Bruton Smith) as track president.

Format and eligibility 
Any driver who had won from the last season or the current season up to the race was eligible to race in The Winston. In addition, one additional driver, the winner of the Winston Open, would be added to the field.

The race remained at its 70 lap format, but for 1998, only green flag laps would count in any segment, not just the third segment.

The second ten-minute break was eliminated and replaced with caution laps, and cars would have the option of pitting for tires and fuel, at the expense of losing track position.

The inversion is changed to a random draw between 3 and 12 cars for the inversion after the first segment.

In 1998, qualifying for The Winston Open was changed. Previously it was accomplished with one-lap qualifying runs. From 1998 to 2000, the No Bull 25 Shootout twin races determined the lineups. Practice speeds (odd/even) from earlier in the day set the field for two 25-lap sprint races. The finish order for the first 25 set the odd positions for the Winston Open, and the finish order for the second 25 set the even positions for the Winston Open.

At the end of 30 laps, with only green-flag laps counting, a giant pegboard will help determine what happens next. A marker will be dropped onto the board and will settle into one of 10 slots numbered from three through 12. That will be the number of positions inverted for the start of the second segment.

 Segment 1: 30 Green Flag laps (no caution laps count)
 Segment 2: 30 Green Flag laps (no caution laps count) / Pit stops optional (cars lose track position if they pit)
 Segment 3: 10 Green Flag laps (no caution laps count)

Entry list 

 (R) denotes rookie driver.

Winston Open

The Winston

Winston Open practice

First Winston Open practice and No Bull 25s lineup 
The first Winston Open was held on Friday, May 21, at 1:00 PM EST. The session would last for 50 minutes. The speeds from the practice session would determine the lineups for the No Bull 25 races, the qualifying races for the Winston Open. Odd position drivers in the session would be placed in Race #1, and even position drivers would be placed in Race #2. Meanwhile, Joe Gibbs Racing driver Tony Stewart would earn the pole in Race #2, earning the second fastest time in the session.

Race #1

Race #2

Second Winston Open practice 
The second practice for the Winston Open was held on Saturday, May 22, at 1:00 PM EST. The session would last for 40 minutes.

Final Winston Open practice 
The final practice for the Winston Open was held on Saturday, May 22, at 2:30 PM EST. The session would last for 40 minutes.

The Winston practice

First practice 
The first practice for The Winston was held on Friday, May 21, at 10:30 AM EST. The session would last for 55 minutes.

Second practice 
The second practice for The Winston was held on Friday, May 21, at 2:10 PM EST. The session would last for one hour and 45 minutes.

Third practice 
The third practice for The Winston was held on Friday, May 21, after the preliminary No Bull 25 races. The session would last for 30 minutes.

Fourth practice 
The fourth practice for The Winston was held on Saturday, May 22, at 1:45 PM EST. The session would last for 55 minutes.

Final practice 
The final practice for The Winston was held on Saturday, May 22, at 3:15 PM EST. The session would last for 45 minutes.

No Bull 25s 
The two No Bull 25 races was held on Friday, May 21. The first race would set the odd positions for the Winston Open, and the second race would set the even positions. In the first race, Richard Childress Racing driver Mike Skinner would dominate the race to earn the overall pole for the race. In the second race, Joe Gibbs Racing driver Tony Stewart would proceed to do the same in his race.

No Bull 25 Race #1 results

No Bull 25 Race #2 results

Winston Open lineup

The Winston qualifying 
Qualifying for The Winston was held on Friday, May 21, at 7:00 PM EST. Each driver would run 3 laps each, with each driver having to do a mandatory pit stop following the driver's first or second lap.

Full Winston Open qualifying results

Winston Open race results

The Winston race results

References 

1999 NASCAR Winston Cup Series
NASCAR races at Charlotte Motor Speedway
May 1999 sports events in the United States
1999 in sports in North Carolina
NASCAR All-Star Race